The 1970 Florida State Seminole baseball team represented Florida State University in the 1970 NCAA University Division baseball season. The Seminoles played their home games at Seminole Field. The team was coached by Jack Stallings in his 2nd season at Florida State.

The Seminoles lost the College World Series, defeated by the USC Trojans in the championship game.

Roster

Schedule 

! style="" | Regular Season
|- valign="top" 

|- align="center" bgcolor="#ccffcc"
| March 4 ||  || Seminole Field || 5–1 || 1–0
|- align="center" bgcolor="#ccffcc"
| March 4 || Union (TN) || Seminole Field || 6–2 || 2–0
|- align="center" bgcolor="#ccffcc"
| March 13 ||  || Seminole Field || 6–1 || 3–0
|- align="center" bgcolor="#ccffcc"
| March 14 || Saint Leo || Seminole Field || 5–4 || 4–0
|- align="center" bgcolor="#ccffcc"
| March 20 || at  || Henley Field || 1–0 || 5–0
|- align="center" bgcolor="#ccffcc"
| March 21 || at  || Miami Field || 10–1 || 6–0
|- align="center" bgcolor="#ffcccc"
| March 22 || vs  || Miami Field || 5–6 || 6–1
|- align="center" bgcolor="#ccffcc"
| March 22 || at Miami || Miami Field || 8–3 || 7–1
|- align="center" bgcolor="#ccffcc"
| March 24 || at  || Conrad Park || 1–0 || 8–1
|- align="center" bgcolor="#ccffcc"
| March 25 ||  || Seminole Field || 17–8 || 9–1
|- align="center" bgcolor="#ccffcc"
| March 25 ||  || Seminole Field || 6–1 || 10–1
|- align="center" bgcolor="#ccffcc"
| March 26 ||  || Seminole Field || 8–1 || 11–1
|- align="center" bgcolor="#ccffcc"
| March 27 || NYU || Seminole Field || 4–2 || 12–1
|- align="center" bgcolor="#ccffcc"
| March 27 ||  || Seminole Field || 6–1 || 13–1
|- align="center" bgcolor="#ccffcc"
| March 30 ||  || Seminole Field || 15–6 || 14–1
|- align="center" bgcolor="#ccffcc"
| March 30 || North Carolina || Seminole Field || 5–4 || 15–1
|- align="center" bgcolor="#ccffcc"
| March 31 || North Carolina || Seminole Field || 3–2 || 16–1
|-

|- align="center" bgcolor="#ccffcc"
| April 1 ||  || Seminole Field || 5–4 || 17–1
|- align="center" bgcolor="#ccffcc"
| April 2 ||  || Seminole Field || 6–2 || 18–1
|- align="center" bgcolor="#ccffcc"
| April 2 ||  || Seminole Field || 11–4 || 19–1
|- align="center" bgcolor="#ccffcc"
| April 3 || Illinois || Seminole Field || 10–0 || 20–1
|- align="center" bgcolor="#ccffcc"
| April 4 || Holy Cross || Seminole Field || 3–0 || 21–1
|- align="center" bgcolor="#ccffcc"
| April 4 || Maryland || Seminole Field || 4–3 || 22–1
|- align="center" bgcolor="#ccffcc"
| April 6 ||  || Seminole Field || 10–4 || 23–1
|- align="center" bgcolor="#ffcccc"
| April 7 || Auburn || Seminole Field || 3–5 || 23–2
|- align="center" bgcolor="#ccffcc"
| April 10 || at  || Unknown || 4–8 || 24–2
|- align="center" bgcolor="#ccffcc"
| April 11 || at South Alabama || Unknown || 4–0 || 25–2
|- align="center" bgcolor="#ccffcc"
| April 11 || at South Alabama || Unknown || 11–0 || 26–2
|- align="center" bgcolor="#ccffcc"
| April 17 || at  || Red McEwen Field || 7–0 || 27–2
|- align="center" bgcolor="#ccffcc"
| April 18 || at South Florida || Red McEwen Field|| 8–0 || 28–2
|- align="center" bgcolor="#ccffcc"
| April 19 || at Saint Leo || Dade City Park || 8–3 || 29–2
|- align="center" bgcolor="#ccffcc"
| April 23 || Florida Southern || Seminole Field || 7–6 || 30–2
|- align="center" bgcolor="#ccffcc"
| April 24 || South Alabama || Seminole Field || 9–0 || 31–2
|- align="center" bgcolor="#ffcccc"
| April 25 || South Alabama || Seminole Field || 3–5 || 31–3
|- align="center" bgcolor="#bbbbbb"
| April 25 || South Alabama || Seminole Field || 2–2 || 31–3–1
|-

|- align="center" bgcolor="#ccffcc"
| May 1 ||  || Seminole Field || 12–5 || 32–3–1
|- align="center" bgcolor="#ccffcc"
| May 2 || Georgia Southern || Seminole Field || 8–4 || 33–3–1
|- align="center" bgcolor="#ccffcc"
| May 4 ||  || Seminole Field || 4–1 || 34–3–1
|- align="center" bgcolor="#ccffcc"
| May 5 || Jacksonville || Seminole Field || 2–8 || 35–3–1
|- align="center" bgcolor="#ccffcc"
| May 8 || Miami (FL) || Seminole Field || 11–4 || 36–3–1
|- align="center" bgcolor="#ccffcc"
| May 9 || Miami (FL) || Seminole Field || 6–2 || 37–3–1
|- align="center" bgcolor="#ffcccc"
| May 11 || at  || Perry Field || 1–3 || 37–4–1
|- align="center" bgcolor="#ffcccc"
| May 12 || at Florida || Perry Field || 4–5 || 37–5–1
|- align="center" bgcolor="#ccffcc"
| May 15 || at Georgia Southern || Unknown || 8–3 || 38–5–1
|- align="center" bgcolor="#ffcccc"
| May 16 || at Georgia Southern || Unknown || 1–2 || 38–6–1
|- align="center" bgcolor="#ccffcc"
| May 18 || at Auburn || Plainsman Park || 5–0 || 39–6–1
|- align="center" bgcolor="#ccffcc"
| May 19 || at Auburn || Plainsman Park || 7–6 || 40–6–1
|- align="center" bgcolor="#ffcccc"
| May 22 || Florida || Seminole Field || 3–4 || 40–7–1
|- align="center" bgcolor="#ccffcc"
| May 23 || Florida || Seminole Field || 1–0 || 41–7–1
|- align="center" bgcolor="#ccffcc"
| May 23 || Florida || Seminole Field || 9–4 || 42–7–1
|-

|-
! style="" | Postseason
|-

|- align="center" bgcolor="#ccffcc"
| vs  || Sims Legion Park || 2–0 || 43–7–1
|- align="center" bgcolor="#ccffcc"
| vs Maryland || Sims Legion Park || 10–1 || 44–7–1
|- align="center" bgcolor="#ccffcc"
| vs  || Sims Legion Park || 5–4 || 45–7–1
|-

|- align="center" bgcolor="#ccffcc"
| vs Arizona || Rosenblatt Stadium || 4–0 || 46–7–1
|- align="center" bgcolor="#ccffcc"
| vs Dartmouth || Rosenblatt Stadium || 6–0 || 47–7–1
|- align="center" bgcolor="#ffcccc"
| vs Texas || Rosenblatt Stadium || 1–5 || 47–8–1
|- align="center" bgcolor="#ccffcc"
| vs  || Rosenblatt Stadium || 2–0 || 48–8–1
|- align="center" bgcolor="#ccffcc"
| vs Texas || Rosenblatt Stadium || 11–2 || 49–8–1
|- align="center" bgcolor="#ffcccc"
| vs USC || Rosenblatt Stadium || 1–2 || 49–9–1
|-

Awards and honors 
Dick Nichols
 Second Team All-American
 Sporting News First Team All-American

Johnny Grubb
 Sporting News Honorable Mention All-American
 All-Tournament Team

Ron Cash
 Sporting News Honorable Mention All-American

Pat Osborn
 Sporting News Honorable Mention All-American

Gene Ammann
 All-Tournament Team

Seminoles in the 1970 MLB Draft 
The following members of the Florida State Seminoles baseball program were drafted in the 1970 Major League Baseball Draft.

References 

Florida State Seminoles baseball seasons
College World Series seasons
Florida State Seminoles
Florida State